The 1932 Giro d'Italia was the 20th edition of the Giro d'Italia, organized and sponsored by the newspaper La Gazzetta dello Sport. The race was won by the Antonio Pesenti of the Wolsit team. Second and third respectively were the Belgian Jef Demuysere and Italian Remo Bertoni.

It was one of the last participations of Costante Girardengo, 39 years old, who classified second in the first stage, but then retired during the fifth stage. The 47-year-old age Giovanni Gerbi, nicknamed "the Red Devil", also took part, but also didn't succeed in concluding the race.

Participants

Of the 109 riders that began the Giro d'Italia on 14 May, 66 of them made it to the finish in Milan on 5 June. Riders were allowed to ride on their own or as a member of a team. There were ten teams that competed in the race: Atala-Hutchinson, Bianchi-Pirelli, France Sport-Pirelli, Ganna-Dunlop, Gloria-Hutchinson, Ilva-Pirelli, Legnano-Hutchinson, Maino-Clément, Olympia-Superga, and Wolsit-Hutchinson.

The peloton was primarily composed of Italians. The field featured four former Giro d'Italia champions in four-time winner Alfredo Binda, two-time champion Costante Girardengo, 1920 winner Gaetano Belloni, and reigning winner Francesco Camusso. Other notable Italian riders that started the race included Learco Guerra, Giovanni Gerbi, Felice Gremo, and Domenico Piemontesi. The reigning winner of the Tour de France, Frenchman Antonin Magne, raced started the Giro, along with Belgian Jef Demuysere who finished second at the 1931 Tour de France.

Route and stages

Classification leadership

The leader of the general classification – calculated by adding the stage finish times of each rider – wore a pink jersey. This classification is the most important of the race, and its winner is considered as the winner of the Giro.

The race organizers allowed isolated riders to compete in the race, which had a separate classification calculated the same way as the general classification. In addition, there was a classification dedicated to only foreign, non-Italian riders, which was calculated in the same manner.

The winner of the team classification was determined by adding the finish times of the best three cyclists per team together and the team with the lowest total time was the winner. If a team had fewer than three riders finish, they were not eligible for the classification.

Il Trofeo Magno was a classification for independent Italian riders competing in the race. The riders were divided into teams based on the region of Italy they were from. The calculation of the standings was the same for the team classification. At the end of the race, a trophy was awarded to the winning team and it was then stored at the Federal Secretary of the P.N.P. in their respective province.

The rows in the following table correspond to the jerseys awarded after that stage was run.

Final standings

General classification

There were 66 cyclists who had completed all thirteen stages. For these cyclists, the times they had needed in each stage was added up for the general classification. The cyclist with the least accumulated time was the winner.

Foreign rider classification

Isolati rider classification

Team classification

Il Trofeo Magno

References

Footnotes

Citations

 
G
Giro d'Italia
Giro d'Italia
Giro d'Italia
Giro d'Italia by year